Phosacetim is a toxic organophosphate compound, which acts as an acetylcholinesterase inhibitor and is used as a rodenticide.

References

Acetylcholinesterase inhibitors
Rodenticides
Chlorobenzenes
Phosphoramidothioates
Phenol ethers
Amidines